Daniele Ciprì (born 17 August 1962) is an Italian film director and cinematographer.

He is best known for his collaborations with Franco Maresco and for his film It Was the Son.

See also
Ciprì e Maresco

References

External links
 

1962 births
Living people
Film people from Palermo
Italian film directors
Italian cinematographers
Ciak d'oro winners